The Willys FAMAE Corvo was an off-road multipurpose vehicle intended for use with the Chilean Armed Forces. Its chassis was originally from a Willys MB and was capable of carrying various types of mounted weapons such as a 106mm recoilless anti-tank launcher.

It was designed in 1977 by Fábricas y Maestranzas del Ejército (FAMAE), to address the shortage of military equipment in the country at this time. Only a single prototype was produced for testing, which ended up for many years forgotten in a barn, after undergoing trials in desert conditions for several months.

A sales engineer, René Inostroza acquired and restored it. It has since been put on sale at a price of 2.5 million pesos.

See also
 Ñandú (jeep)
 IAME Rastrojero

References
 

FAMAE
Jeep
Motor vehicles manufactured in the United States
Military light utility vehicles
Military equipment of Chile